Artūras Rimkevičius (14 April 1983 – 23 September 2019) was a Lithuanian footballer who played as a striker.

He committed suicide by gunshot on 23 September 2019, aged 36.

Career

Club
Artūras played for FK Tauras Tauragė, FBK Kaunas, FK Liepājas Metalurgs, FK Silute, FK Šiauliai, FK Bekentas, Atlantis FC. and Asteras Tripoli F.C.

Artūras is the current holder of the Lithuanian football record of most goals scored in a single season, 35.

Artūras was expected to complete a move to Scottish side Heart of Midlothian in January 2013. However the deal did not go through. He played for 2012 Singapore League Runners-up and League Cup champions, Brunei DPMM FC.

In May 2014 he returned to Kaunas and signed with FC Stumbras.

National
Artūras made his international debut against Latvia in June 2010, scoring three times for his country in seven caps, one against Estonia and two against Armenia.

International goals

Tributes
Since 2019 A Lyga season, the A Lyga Top Scorer award has been posthumously renamed as Artūras Rimkevičius Trophy.

References

External links
 Artūras Rimkevičius Interview
 Artūras Rimkevičius: "No European club has offered me as much as Brunei"

1983 births
2019 deaths
A Lyga players
Association football forwards
Asteras Tripolis F.C. players
Atlantis FC players
DPMM FC players
Ethnikos Piraeus F.C. players
Expatriate footballers in Brunei
Expatriate footballers in Finland
Expatriate footballers in Greece
Expatriate footballers in Latvia
FBK Kaunas footballers
FC Stumbras players
FK Ekranas players
FK Liepājas Metalurgs players
FK Tauras Tauragė players
FC Šiauliai players
FK Šilutė players
Football League (Greece) players
I Lyga players
Kakkonen players
Latvian Higher League players
Lithuania international footballers
Lithuanian expatriate footballers
Lithuanian expatriate sportspeople in Brunei
Lithuanian expatriate sportspeople in Finland
Lithuanian expatriate sportspeople in Greece
Lithuanian expatriate sportspeople in Latvia
Lithuanian footballers
Singapore Premier League players
Suicides by firearm in Lithuania
Super League Greece players
Ykkönen players
2019 suicides